Kentucky Route 388 (KY 388) is a  state highway in Madison County, Kentucky, that runs from U.S. Route 25 Business, Kentucky Route 52, and South Second Street in downtown Richmond to Kentucky Route 627 just to the west of Boonesborough. The route passes through Fort Boonesborough State Park, and also comes within  of Clark County.

Major intersections

References

0388
Transportation in Madison County, Kentucky
Richmond, Kentucky